NextNav, Inc. is the developer of a 3D geolocation service called Metropolitan Beacon System (MBS), a wide area location and timing technology designed to provide services in areas where GPS or other satellite location signals cannot be reliably received. MBS consumes significantly less power than GPS, and includes high-precision altitude. In the United States, NextNav operates its MBS network over its spectrum licenses in the 920-928 MHz band. The company went public on Nasdaq in October 2021 with a merger with special-purpose acquisition company Spartacus Acquisition Corporation.

Technology  

NextNav distributed its Pinnacle vertical location service in January 2021, which provides floor-level vertical location using barometric sensors from cell phones and other devices. Their Pinnacle network was distributed in partnership with AT&T and is in more than 4,400 cities across the United States. The larger NextNav network uses Metropolitan Beacon System technology to deliver high precision three-dimensional indoor location capabilities across a market area. MBS is built on principles similar to GPS  transmitting precisely timed signals from a network of wide-area beacons enabling receivers to use trilateration techniques to determine their precise location. This differs significantly from other approaches to indoor and urban location, which rely on short-range, local-area transmitters.

Due to the terrestrial placement of the transmitters and sub-GHz nature of the signal, MBS signals can travel several kilometers and—because the network is specifically designed, deployed, and managed for indoor positioning—can be reliably received in deep indoor conditions that block satellite signals (e.g., GPS, GLONASS). MBS signals also enable location to be computed with far lower power drain than GPS. In addition, the system incorporates barometric pressure compensation technology that allows receivers equipped with pressure sensors to compute their altitude very precisely, typically within a floor.

A byproduct of the GPS-like operating principles of NextNav's MBS network is the ability to deliver high-precision (Stratum-1-level) timing to indoor locations or in the event of GPS outages.

MBS receivers are being commercialized as an additional constellation added to multi-constellation GNSS processors. Today's GPS processors typically process additional satellite constellations, and the MBS processing capability constitutes primarily firmware additions.

The performance of the technology under emergency dialling conditions was originally demonstrated in the CSRIC III test bed in San Francisco in 2012, with performance enhancements added on an ongoing basis. More recently the technology was enabled in the primary global telecommunication standards bodies, 3GPP (Release 13) and OMA (SUPL 2.0.3). MBS signal technology is available under FRAND terms.

The technology can be scaled for any location application, including services to mobile phones, Internet of Things, and enterprise and public safety applications.

Coverage  
NextNav's Urban and Indoor Positioning service TerraPoiNT is available in San Francisco Bay Area, McLean, VA and other select markets. Its Pinnacle vertical location service is available in more than 4,400 cities nationwide, and has partnered with AT&T FirstNet to provide vertical location service for First Responders.

Acquisitions 
In November 2022, it was announced NextNav had acquired the Neuilly-sur-Seine-based low-power geolocation system provider, Nestwave.

References

External links

Global Positioning System
American companies established in 2007
Technology companies established in 2007
Companies based in Sunnyvale, California
2007 establishments in California
Technology companies based in the San Francisco Bay Area
Companies listed on the Nasdaq
Special-purpose acquisition companies